William Seaman (1925–1997) was an American photojournalist.

William Seaman may also refer to:

William B. Seaman (1875–1910), American football and baseball player and coach
William Grant Seaman (1866–1944), American Methodist Episcopal minister
William Henry Seaman (1842–1915), U.S. federal judge

See also
William Seamon, bridge player
Bill Seman, CFL player
William Seaman Bainbridge